Igor Tkachenko (born 14 January 1964 in Frunze) is a former Kyrgyzstani football player.

References

1964 births
Living people
Soviet footballers
FC Alga Bishkek players
FC Vostok players
Kyrgyzstani footballers
FC Krystal Chortkiv players
Kyrgyzstani expatriate footballers
Expatriate footballers in Ukraine
FC Ural Yekaterinburg players
Expatriate footballers in Russia
Russian Premier League players
FC Dordoi Bishkek players
Association football midfielders
Association football defenders
FC Nosta Novotroitsk players